Gaillards is a naval term for the forecastle and quarterdeck (together) on a sailing warship.

Gaillard may also refer to:

Places
Gaillard, a commune of the Haute-Savoie département, in France
Château-Gaillard, Ain, a commune in the French département of Ain
Château Gaillard, a ruined medieval castle in Normandy, France
Gaillard Cut, old name for Culebra Cut, a man-made valley cutting through the continental divide in Panama
Gaillard, Georgia, a community in the United States
Gaillard Island, a dredge disposal island located in Alabama, United States
La Gaillarde, a commune in Seine Maritime, France
La Gaillarde campus, a campus in Montpellier, France
Brive-la-Gaillarde, a commune in Corrèze, France

People

A forename
Gaillard I de Durfort (died 1356/7), French priest and nobleman
Gaillard II de Durfort (died 1422), seneschal of Gascony
Gaillard III de Durfort (died 1452), seneschal of Landes
Gaillard IV de Durfort (died 1482), French nobleman
Gailard Sartain (born 1946), American actor
Gaillard Hunt (1862–1924), U.S. author and civil servant
Theodore Gaillard Croft 1874–1920), U.S. army soldier and congressman from South Carolina
Theodore Gaillard Hunt (1805–1893), U.S. Congressman
Theodore Gaillard Thomas (1832–1903), U.S. gynaecologist

A surname
Albert Gaillard (1858–1903), French mycologist
Alizée Gaillard (also known as Alizée Sorel; born 1985), Swiss-Haitian fashion model
Bob Gaillard (born 1940), U.S. college basketball coach and businessman
Carolina Gaillard (born 1981), Argentine politician
Claude Gaillard (born 1944), French politician
Claude Ferdinand Gaillard (1834–1887), French engraver and painter
David du Bose Gaillard (1859–1913), U.S. Army engineer who worked on the Panama Canal project
Eddie Gaillard (born 1970), U.S. baseball player
Emmanuel Gaillard (born 1952), French lawyer and arbitration specialist
Félix Gaillard (1919–1970), French Prime Minister
Françoise Gaillard (born 1936), French art and literary critic, philosopher, professor, and art curator
Frédéric Gaillard (born 1989), French footballer
Gabriel-Henri Gaillard (1726–1806), French historian
Geneviève Gaillard (born 1947), French veterinarian and politician
Greetje Gaillard (born 1926), Dutch Olympic swimmer
Jean-Marc Gaillard (born 1980), French cross country skier and Olympic competitor
Jean-Michel Gaillard (1946–2005), French author, public television executive, and senior adviser at the Élysée Palace
John Gaillard (1765–1826), U.S. Senator from South Carolina
Lamont Gaillard (born 1996), American football player
Marcel Gaillard (Belgian footballer) (1927–1976), Belgian footballer
Marcel Gaillard (French footballer) (born 1923), French footballer
Martine Gaillard (born 1971), Canadian sports television personality
Mary K. Gaillard (born 1939), U.S. theoretical physicist
Micha Gaillard (died 2010), Haitian politician and university professor
Ophélie Gaillard (born 1974), French cellist
Patrick Gaillard (born 1952), French Formula One auto racer
Perceval Gaillard (born 1983), French politician
Rémi Gaillard (born 1975), French humorist and internet video uploader
Roger Gaillard (disambiguation), a disambiguation page
Slim Gaillard (1916–1991), U.S. Afro-Cuban jazz singer, songwriter, pianist, and guitarist
Virgile Gaillard (1877–?unknown), French footballer
William Gaillard (born ?), French UEFA football public relations executive
Yann Gaillard (born 1936), French politician

Others
Gaillard (grape), French wine grape that is also known as Enfariné noir
Gaillard blanc, another name for the French wine grape Clairette blanche
A garou auspice from the role playing game Werewolf: The Apocalypse (see Werewolf: The Apocalypse#Auspices)

See also
Galliard (disambiguation)
Gallardo (disambiguation)
Gaylord (disambiguation)
Gailliard, a surname

French masculine given names
French-language surnames